The 2010–11 season was Chelsea Football Club's 97th competitive season, 19th consecutive season in the Premier League, and 105th year in existence as a football club. They went into the Premier League as the defending champions, but failed to retain it.

The club was managed by their Double-winning manager Carlo Ancelotti, but his association with the club would be broken off, being sacked at the end of the season. Chelsea started off the season with an amazing five-consecutive-wins run in the Premier League, which was eventually halted by Manchester City when City skipper Carlos Tevez scored to lead his side into a 1–0 triumph over the defending champions. Chelsea were leading the Premier League table for almost half a season, before Manchester United overtook them when Chelsea went through a bad period during the winter saga. Altogether in the Premier League, Chelsea won 21 games, drew 8 and lost 9. They conceded the fewest goals compared to all the other clubs in the league, sharing this with Manchester City.

In January 2011, on the last day of the transfer window, Chelsea bought Fernando Torres for a club-record-breaking and British-record-breaking fee of £50 million from Liverpool. They also bought defender David Luiz from Benfica, for €25 million plus Nemanja Matić, on the same day.

Kits
Supplier: Adidas / Sponsor: Samsung

Key dates
9 June 2010: Chelsea announce that they are to release Joe Cole, Michael Ballack and Juliano Belletti, whose contracts run out at the end of the month.
17 June 2010: Premier League fixtures for the 2010–11 season are announced. Chelsea are to open their defence of the Premier League crown at home to West Bromwich Albion, managed by former Blues midfielder Roberto Di Matteo.
2 July 2010: Chelsea make their first signing of the summer as Israeli national team captain Yossi Benayoun joins from Liverpool for £5.5 million on a three-year deal.
7 July 2010: Chelsea sign 17-year-old Czech defender Tomáš Kalas from Sigma Olomouc in a deal worth £5.2 million, though he is immediately loaned back to Sigma Olomouc.
7 August 2010: Deco is allowed to leave Chelsea on compassionate grounds. He joins Brazilian club Fluminense for an undisclosed fee, linking up with former Chelsea teammate Juliano Belletti, who was released earlier in the summer.
8 August 2010: Chelsea are defeated 3–1 at Wembley by Manchester United in the 2010 FA Community Shield. United's Antonio Valencia opens the scoring in the first half, before Javier Hernández doubles their lead in the second. Salomon Kalou nets with seven minutes remaining, but Dimitar Berbatov's lob seals the game for United in added time.
9 August 2010: Scott Sinclair joins Championship side Swansea City for an initial fee of £500,000, which could rise to £1 million.
10 August 2010: After six years at Chelsea, Ricardo Carvalho joins Real Madrid for a fee of €8 million, where he is reunited with former Chelsea manager José Mourinho.
13 August 2010: Chelsea announce the signing of Ramires from Benfica for a fee of €22 million. The Brazilian signs a four-year deal.
14 August 2010: Chelsea begin the Premier League season with a resounding 6–0 win over newly promoted West Bromwich Albion. Didier Drogba scores a hat-trick, his second in consecutive matches at Stamford Bridge following his treble in the final weekend of the 2009–10 season. Florent Malouda bags a brace, while Frank Lampard scores one goal.
20 August 2010: 21-year-old defender Sam Hutchinson announces his retirement from professional football having suffered a recurrence of the knee injury which blighted his past three seasons. In total, he started one game for the first team and made three substitute appearances.
21 August 2010: Chelsea continue their goalscoring extravaganza as they defeat Wigan Athletic 0–6 at the DW Stadium. Florent Malouda opens the scoring a little after half an hour, while Nicolas Anelka and Salomon Kalou grab braces in the second half. Substitute Yossi Benayoun scores his first Chelsea goal in added time to complete the rout. Following Manchester United's draw with Fulham, Chelsea are the only team left with a 100% record in the Premier League.
26 August 2010: Chelsea draw Marseille, Spartak Moscow and Žilina in the group stages of the 2010–11 UEFA Champions League.
15 September 2010: Chelsea begin their Champions League campaign with a 1–4 away win against Žilina. Michael Essien opens the scoring after 13 minutes, and Nicolas Anelka's quick double puts them 3–0 up after half an hour. Daniel Sturridge scores his first Champions League goal for Chelsea in the second half, before Tomáš Oravec nabs a consolation.
22 September 2010: Chelsea suffer their first loss of the season as they crash out in the third round of the League Cup to Newcastle United, who defeat them 3–4 at Stamford Bridge. After Nicolas Anelka scores twice to bring the score from 1–3 to 3–3, Shola Ameobi scores an injury-time winner for the away side.
25 September 2010: Chelsea suffer a consecutive loss, their second in four days, as their 100% record in the League comes to an end with a 1–0 loss to Manchester City at Eastlands. Carlos Tevez scores the only goal of the game, on the hour.
3 October 2010: Chelsea defeat London rivals Arsenal 2–0 at Stamford Bridge in the first of the traditional "Big Four" clashes of the season. Didier Drogba's flick and Alex's crashing free kick send Chelsea four points clear at the top.
16 October 2010: Chelsea go without scoring for the second away league game in succession as they play out a 0–0 stalemate against Aston Villa. However, following Manchester United's earlier draw with West Brom, they maintain their five-point lead at the top of the league.
3 November 2010: A 4–1 win against Spartak Moscow ensures Chelsea's place in the knockout stages of the Champions League. With the score locked at 0–0 at the break, Nicolas Anelka opens the scoring in the second half from a tight angle, before Didier Drogba scores a penalty. Branislav Ivanović also scores his first Chelsea goals at Stamford Bridge either side of Nikita Bazhenov's consolation – the first goal conceded at Stamford Bridge for 956 minutes in all competitions.
7 November 2010: In the second of the former "Big Four" clashes of the season, Chelsea are defeated 2–0 by Liverpool at Anfield. Fernando Torres scores both goals.
11 November 2010: Chelsea part company with assistant manager Ray Wilkins. The former Blues player, who had enjoyed a previous stint at the club as assistant to Gianluca Vialli from 1999 to 2000, leaves again having rejoined for a second time in September 2008.
14 November 2010: Chelsea suffer a shock 0–3 defeat to Sunderland at Stamford Bridge, their second league loss in the space of a week. It is their heaviest home league defeat since Manchester United triumphed by a similar scoreline in 2002.
18 November 2010: Michael Emenalo is appointed as successor to Ray Wilkins in the role of assistant manager. Emenalo, who joined Chelsea in October 2007, is promoted from his position as head opposition scout.
20 November 2010: Chelsea fall to their third league defeat in four games as they lose 0–1 to Birmingham City at St Andrew's. Lee Bowyer scores the only goal of the game, while Ben Foster makes a string of excellent saves. Following Manchester United's win against Wigan, Chelsea now only lead the table on goal difference.
23 November 2010: A 2–1 win over Žilina ensures that Chelsea will be a top seed in the Champions League draw for the knock-out stages. Daniel Sturridge and Florent Malouda score the goals.
29 December 2010: Chelsea's last match of 2010 sees them end a horrid run of results without a win as they beat Bolton Wanderers 1–0 at Stamford Bridge, their first win in six league games.
2 January 2011: Chelsea begin 2011 with a thrilling 3–3 draw at home to Aston Villa. John Terry's 89th-minute goal looks to have sealed the game, only for Ciaran Clark to equalise in injury time.
5 January 2011: A 0–1 defeat to bottom club Wolverhampton Wanderers leaves Chelsea fifth in the league table.
9 January 2011: Chelsea begin their defence of the FA Cup with a resounding 7–0 win over Ipswich Town at Stamford Bridge.
24 January 2011: Chelsea triumph 0–4 against Bolton Wanderers at Reebok Stadium, their third consecutive win on the bounce as they look to put their poor run of form behind them.
31 January 2011: In a dramatic January transfer deadline day, Chelsea smash the British transfer record as they sign Fernando Torres from Liverpool for £50 million. Meanwhile, Chelsea also secure the signature of Benfica's David Luiz in a deal worth €25 million, with Nemanja Matić to move the other way in the summer.
6 February 2011: Chelsea lose 0–1 to Liverpool at Stamford Bridge, with Raul Meireles scoring the only goal in the 69th minute.
19 February 2011: Chelsea draw 1–1 after extra time to Everton in the FA Cup. Frank Lampard scored early in extra to give Chelsea the lead, but a free kick by Leighton Baines leveled the sides late. The sides went to penalties in which Chelsea were defeated 4–3, ending their two-year run as FA Cup holders.
1 March 2011: Chelsea triumph 2–1 against Manchester United to reignite their chances of defending the Premier League title. A strike from David Luiz cancels out Wayne Rooney's goal to level the match at 1–1, before a late Frank Lampard penalty seals the 2–1 win.
16 March 2011: Chelsea are held 0–0 by Copenhagen at Stamford Bridge, but progress to the Champions League quarter-finals with an aggregate score of 2–0.
20 March 2011: Chelsea defeat Manchester City 2–0 at Stamford Bridge. David Luiz first heads from Didier Drogba's free kick in the 78th minute. Ramires scores the second in the 90th minute, his second Premier League goal for Chelsea. Chelsea advance to third place in the league table, nine points behind Manchester United with a game in hand.
12 April 2011: Chelsea are knocked out of the UEFA Champions League quarter finals by rivals Manchester United. Chelsea lost the first leg at Stamford Bridge; Wayne Rooney scoring the only goal on 29 minutes. The second leg at Old Trafford ends 2–1 in Manchester United's favour. Javier Hernández scoring before half-time. Didier Drogba equalises with 15 minutes to go after coming off the bench but is almost instantly cancelled out by Park Ji-sung.
21 April 2011: Chelsea move into second in the Premier League table, on goal difference, with a 3–1 win over Birmingham City combined with Arsenal's 3–3 draw at Tottenham Hotspur.
24 April 2011: Fernando Torres scores his first goal for Chelsea against West Ham United in between a Frank Lampard strike and a Florent Malouda screamer, the latter provides the assist.
30 April 2011: Chelsea come from behind to beat Tottenham 2–1 at Stamford Bridge in controversial fashion. After Sandro gives Tottenham the lead with a shot from 30 yards, Chelsea equalise before half time when Heurelho Gomes lets Frank Lampard's long range effort through his body and over the line. Replays later appear to indicate that all of the ball had not crossed the line, but the goal is given. Then substitute Salomon Kalou, with minutes to go, stabs in Didier Drogba's fluffed shot from close range. Replays later show that Kalou was offside when the shot was taken, but again the goal is given. The result brought Chelsea only three points behind league leaders Manchester United, following their 0–1 defeat to Arsenal – with Man United the next side for Chelsea to play. A victory would take Chelsea top of the league with only two games left to play.
8 May 2011: Manchester United beat Chelsea 2–1 to inch closer to the record 19th title. Javier Hernández and Nemanja Vidić put United 2–0 up in the first half. Frank Lampard pulled one back in the second half, but it wasn't enough, as Manchester United kept their defense tight and held on to win the match.
22 May 2011: Carlo Ancelotti is sacked after the last match of the season.

Club

Coaching staff

Other information

|-
||Chief Executive|| Ron Gourlay
|-

Squads

First team squad

Premier League squad

 U21

 U21

 U21
 U21
 U21
 U21

 HG = Home-grown Player
 U21 = Under 21 Player
Source: 2010–11 Premier League squad

UEFA Champions League squad

 B = List B Player
 HG1 = Association-trained player
 HG2 = Club-trained player
Source: 2010–11 UEFA Champions League squad

Reserve squad

Academy squad

Transfers

In

Summer

Winter

Out

Summer

Loan out

Overall transfer activity

Spending
Summer:  £29.8 million

Winter:  £71.5 million

Total:  £101.3 million

Income
Summer:  £13.7 million

Winter:  £0

Total:  £13.7 million

Expenditure
Summer:  £16.1 million

Winter:  £71.5 million

Total:  £87.6 million

Competitions

Pre-season

FA Community Shield

Premier League

League table

Results summary

Results by round

Matches

UEFA Champions League

Group stage

The draw for the group stage was held on 26 August 2010 in Monaco. Chelsea was paired with 2009–10 French Ligue 1 champions Marseille, as well as Russian Premier League's, Spartak Moscow and Žilina of the Slovakian Corgoň Liga.

Knockout phase

Round of 16

Quarter-finals

League Cup

FA Cup

Statistics

Appearances
As of end of season

Goalscorers
As of end of season

Clean sheets
As of end of season

Disciplinary record
As of end of season

Overall
As of end of season

Awards

Notes

References

External links

2010-11
2010–11 Premier League by team
2010–11 UEFA Champions League participants seasons